Marvin Willis Lucas Jr. (born November 15, 1941) is a  Democratic member of the North Carolina House of Representatives, who has represented the 42nd district and its predecessors since 2001. His district includes constituents in Cumberland County. He serves as the House Democratic Conference Co-Chair. Lucas is a retired school principal from Spring Lake, North Carolina. Lucas is African-American.

Committee assignments

2021-2022 session
Appropriations 
Appropriations - Education 
Insurance (Vice Chair)
Education - K-12 
Health
Wildlife Resources

2019-2020 session
Appropriations 
Appropriations - Education 
Insurance (Vice Chair)
Education - K-12 
Health 
Wildlife Resources 
Alcoholic Beverage Control

2017-2018 session
Appropriations
Appropriations - Education
Insurance
Wildlife Resources
Alcoholic Beverage Control
Banking
Health
Homeland Security, Military, and Veterans Affairs
University Board of Governors Nominating

2015-2016 session
Appropriations
Appropriations - Education
Agriculture (Vice Chair)
Alcoholic Beverage Control (Vice Chair)
Insurance
Wildlife Resources
Health
Homeland Security, Military, and Veterans Affairs

2013-2014 session
Appropriations
Education (Vice Chair)
Agriculture
Commerce and Job Development
Public Utilities

2011-2012 session
Appropriations
Education (Vice Chair)
Commerce and Job Development
Public Utilities
Ethics

2009-2010 session
Appropriations
Education
Alcoholic Beverage Control
Wildlife Resources
Public Utilities
Ethics
Local Government II

Electoral history

2022

2020

2018

2016

2014

2012

2010

2008

2006

2004

2002

2000

References

External links
 Marvin Willis Lucas Jr. at Ballotpedia
Project Vote Smart – Representative Marvin Willis Lucas Jr. (NC) profile
Our Campaigns – Representative Marvin Willis Lucas Jr. (NC) profile
North Carolina General Assembly – Representative Marvin W. Lucas Official NC House website

|-

1941 births
Living people
People from Spring Lake, North Carolina
Fayetteville State University alumni
North Carolina Central University alumni
East Carolina University alumni
Educators from North Carolina
American school administrators
African-American state legislators in North Carolina
21st-century American politicians
21st-century African-American politicians
20th-century African-American people
Democratic Party members of the North Carolina House of Representatives